Phyllobrotica viridipennis is a species of skeletonizing leaf beetle in the family Chrysomelidae. It is found in North America.

Subspecies
These two subspecies belong to the species Phyllobrotica viridipennis:
 Phyllobrotica viridipennis mokelensis Blake, 1956
 Phyllobrotica viridipennis viridipennis (J. L. LeConte, 1859)

References

Further reading

 
 

Galerucinae
Articles created by Qbugbot
Beetles described in 1859
Taxa named by John Lawrence LeConte